Pseudognathaphanus is a genus of beetles in the family Carabidae.

Species 
Pseudognathaphanus contains the following eleven species:
Pseudognathaphanus dekkanus Andrewes, 1933
Pseudognathaphanus dispellens (Walker, 1859)
Pseudognathaphanus exaratus (Bates, 1892)
Pseudognathaphanus festivus (Andrewes, 1920)
Pseudognathaphanus fukiensis (Jedlicka, 1957)
Pseudognathaphanus hiekei Kataev & Wrase, 2016
Pseudognathaphanus perrieri (Jeannel, 1948)
Pseudognathaphanus punctilabris (W.S. MacLeay, 1825)
Pseudognathaphanus rufitactor (Bates, 1892)
Pseudognathaphanus rusticus Andrewes, 1920
Pseudognathaphanus zabroides (Alluaud, 1918)

References

Harpalinae